Enna Calcio is an Italian association football club from Enna, Sicily.

The club was founded in 1942 and its official colours are yellow and green. Enna plays its home matches at Stadio Generale Gaeta. The club also had a few appearances in the professional levels of Italian football, a single Serie C season in 1970–1971 and a single Serie C2 campaign in 1990-91. The club also won a trofeo Jacinto in 1990.

References

External links
 Official website

Association football clubs established in 1942
Football clubs in Italy
Football clubs in Sicily
1942 establishments in Italy
Enna